Jean Labatut (1986) was an American architect who taught at Princeton University.

References

20th-century American architects
1986 deaths
Princeton University faculty